Yasmin David (1939–2009) was a British landscape painter. She was the daughter of Lorna Garman Wishart and Laurie Lee. Many of her works were only exhibited posthumously.

She lived in Luscombe in Devon for most of her life, Sicily and Cape Town , until  her death in 2009.

Her half-brother Michael Wishart was also a painter.

She had three children .

References 

British painters
British women painters
20th-century English painters
2009 deaths
1939 births